The women's artistic team all-around gymnastics event at the 2017 Summer Universiade on August 21 at the Taipei Nangang Exhibition Center, Hall 1, 4F in Taipei, Taiwan.

Final results

References

External links
2017 Summer Universiade – Artistic gymnastics

Women's artistic team all-around